is a retired Japanese backstroke swimmer. She competed at the 1960 and 1964 Olympics in the 100 m backstroke and 4×100 m medley relay. She won individual bronze in 1960 and finished fourth in both events in 1964. Between 1959 and 1964 she set 10 world records in the 200 m backstroke, but did not have a chance to compete in this discipline. She set five more world records in the 110 yd and 220 yd backstroke. Tanaka held the national records in the 100 m and 200 m backstroke for 12 years. In retirement for many decades she worked as a swimming coach, and also competed in the masters category. In 1991 she was inducted into the International Swimming Hall of Fame.

See also
 List of members of the International Swimming Hall of Fame
 World record progression 200 metres backstroke

References 

1942 births
Living people
Japanese female backstroke swimmers
Olympic swimmers of Japan
Olympic bronze medalists for Japan
People from Sasebo
Sportspeople from Nagasaki Prefecture
World record setters in swimming
Olympic bronze medalists in swimming
Asian Games medalists in swimming
Swimmers at the 1958 Asian Games
Swimmers at the 1962 Asian Games
Swimmers at the 1966 Asian Games
Swimmers at the 1960 Summer Olympics
Swimmers at the 1964 Summer Olympics
Medalists at the 1960 Summer Olympics
Asian Games gold medalists for Japan
Medalists at the 1958 Asian Games
Medalists at the 1962 Asian Games
Medalists at the 1966 Asian Games
20th-century Japanese women
21st-century Japanese women